The Kesang River is the border river between Johor and Malacca states in the nation of Malaysia, together with the Chohong River. It supplies more than 54 million litres of water daily to the residents.

See also
 Geography of Malaysia

References

Tangkak District
Rivers of Johor
Rivers of Malacca